Ewing was an American racing car constructor.

World Championship Indianapolis 500 results

Formula One constructors (Indianapolis only)
American racecar constructors